Hauteluce (Arpitan: Hôtaluce) is an alpine commune in the Savoie department in the Auvergne-Rhône-Alpes region in Southeastern France. It is located in Beaufortain, on the departmental border with Haute-Savoie. In 2019, Hauteluce had a population of 758.

Geography

Climate

Hauteluce has a humid continental climate (Köppen climate classification Dfb).

See also
Communes of the Savoie department

References

External links
Official site

Communes of Savoie